Elisabetta Caminèr Turra (29 July 1751 – 7 June 1796), was a Venetian writer.

She worked with her father, Domenico, as a translator. Her husband, Antonio Turra, was a noted physician and botanist from Vicenza. From 1774, she participated in the paper Giornale enciclopedico. In 1783, she founded the paper Nuovo giornale enciclopedico. She was active as a translator of foreign plays. She was described as beautiful, energetic and intelligent.

References

 Dizionario Biografico degli Italiani 

1751 births
1796 deaths
Translators to Italian
18th-century Venetian writers
18th-century Venetian women
18th-century translators
Italian salon-holders
18th-century Italian journalists
18th-century women journalists